Carsten Christoffer Linnemann (born 10 August 1977) is a German economist and politician of the Christian Democratic Union (CDU) who has been a member of the German Bundestag since the 2009 election, representing Paderborn. Since 2022, he has been one of five deputy chairs of the CDU, under the leadership of chairman Friedrich Merz.

From 2013 until 2021, Linnemann served as the chairman of MIT, the pro-business wing in the CDU/CSU.

Professional career
Between 2006 and 2007, Linnemann, a devoted Catholic, was an assistant to Norbert Walter, chief economist of Deutsche Bank. He subsequently worked as economist with IKB Deutsche Industriebank from 2007 to 2009, where he focused on small and medium enterprises.

Political career
Since 2009, Linnemann has been serving on the Committee on Labor and Social Affairs, where he is his parliamentary group's rapporteur on welfare payments (Arbeitslosengeld II).

In the negotiations to form a Grand Coalition of the Christian Democrats (CDU together with the Bavarian CSU) and the Social Democrats (SPD) following the 2013 federal elections, Linnemann was part of the CDU/CSU delegation in the working group on labor policy, led by Ursula von der Leyen and Andrea Nahles. In similar talks following the 2017 federal elections, he was again part of the working group on social affairs, this time led Nahles, Karl-Josef Laumann and Barbara Stamm. However, he later abstained in the party leadership's vote on endorsing the renewed grand coalition under Chancellor Angela Merkel.

From 2018 to 2021, Linnemann served as deputy chairman of the CDU/CSU parliamentary group under the leadership of successive chairmen Volker Kauder and Ralph Brinkhaus. In this capacity, he oversaw the group's initiatives on economic policy, small and medium businesses, tourism and energy.

Since 2022, Linnemann has been leading a working group – alongside Serap Güler and Mario Voigt – in charge of drafting the CDU’s new party platform.

Other activities
 Competence Center for Sustainable Energy Technology, University of Paderborn, Member of the Advisory Board (since 2011)
 Institute for Lightweight Design with Hybrid Systems (ILH), University of Paderborn, Member of the Advisory Board (since 2011)
 Ludwig Erhard Foundation, Member
 SC Paderborn 07, Deputy Chairman of the Business Advisory Council

Political positions
On 17 July 2015, Linnemann voted against the government's proposal to negotiate a third bailout for Greece. In June 2017, he voted against Germany's introduction of same-sex marriage.

In 2019, Linnemann drew sharp criticism for saying that children who speak little German shouldn’t immediately be allowed to enter elementary school.

Ahead of the 2021 national elections, Linnemann endorsed Armin Laschet as the Christian Democrats' joint candidate to succeed Chancellor Angela Merkel.

See also 
List of members of the 17th Bundestag

References

External links 
  

1977 births
Living people
German economists
Members of the Bundestag for North Rhine-Westphalia
Members of the Bundestag 2021–2025
Members of the Bundestag 2017–2021
Members of the Bundestag 2013–2017
Members of the Bundestag 2009–2013
Members of the Bundestag for the Christian Democratic Union of Germany